Echmatemys is an extinct genus of geoemydid turtle from the Eocene of North America. It is the oldest North American geoemydids, and is one of the most common early Eocene turtles.

References

Eocene reptiles of North America
Eocene turtles
Geoemydidae
Extinct turtles